The Komet was a German automobile manufactured from 1922 until 1924 by Komet Autofabrik Buchmann & Co of Leisnig.  Later made by another company as the Kenter, this vehicle had a 1060 cc Steudel engine.

References
 David Burgess Wise, The New Illustrated Encyclopedia of Automobiles

Defunct motor vehicle manufacturers of Germany